Panyume is a place located in Morobo County of Central Equatoria State South Sudan and also serves as the administrative area of Panyume payam.

Panyume has been affected with the south Sudan conflict which broke out in 2016 forcing many people to flee to refugees settlements in Uganda.

Health services 
Panyume has a number of health facilities that offer health services to the community across the Payam and beyond such as Panyume PHCC.

Education 
Panyume has a number of primary school which were close during the south Sudan conflict as opposition force where base in the Payam

Referencea 

Populated places in Central Equatoria